Saramoussaya  is a town and sub-prefecture in the Mamou Prefecture in the Mamou Region of Guinea. As of 2014, the sub-prefecture has a population of 23,216, up from 14,326 in 1996.

References

Sub-prefectures of the Mamou Region